Angah , is a village and one of the 51 union councils (administrative subdivisions) of Khushab District in the Punjab Province of Pakistan. It is located at 32° 36' N 72° 5' E.

References

Union councils of Khushab District
Populated places in Khushab District